Anthony Emmanuel Bass (born March 27, 1975) is a former American football defensive back who played two seasons with the Minnesota Vikings of the National Football League. He played college football at Bethune–Cookman University and attended South Charleston High School in South Charleston, West Virginia.

References

External links
Just Sports Stats

Living people
1975 births
Players of American football from West Virginia
American football defensive backs
African-American players of American football
South Charleston High School alumni
Bethune–Cookman Wildcats football players
Minnesota Vikings players
People from St. Albans, West Virginia
21st-century African-American sportspeople
20th-century African-American sportspeople